Ho Tin Tsuen is a village in Tuen Mun District, Hong Kong.

Administration
Ho Tin Tsuen is one of the 36 villages represented within the Tuen Mun Rural Committee.

External links
 Delineation of area of existing village Ho Tin Tsuen (Tuen Mun) for election of resident representative (2019 to 2022)

Villages in Tuen Mun District, Hong Kong